PROLET•KULT is the debut release of OK•ZTEIN•OK, a solo project of Sascha Konietzko (of KMFDM). Both the project and the release were announced on KMFDM's website on March 23, 2011. PROLET•KULT was released April 26 in a limited release of 1,000 copies. The EP makes references to proletkult, a portmanteau of proletarskaya kultura, in both its title and in the title of one of its songs.

Track listing

References 

2011 EPs